Lucie is the French and Czech form of the female name Lucia. Notable people with the name include:

Given name
 Lucie Ahl, British tennis player
 Lucie Arnaz, American actress
 Lucie Aubrac, member of the French Resistance
 Lucie Balthazar, Canadian handball player
 Lucie Bílá, Czech pop singer
 Lucie-Anne Blazek, Swiss figure skater
 Lucie Blue Tremblay, Canadian singer-songwriter
 Lucie Böhm, Austrian orienteer
 Lucie Boissonnas (1839-1877), French writer
 Lucie Brock-Broido, American poet
 Lucie Campbell, American composer
 Lucie Cave, British journalist
 Lucie Charlebois, Canadian politician
 Lucie Daouphars (1922-1963), French model known as Lucky
 Lucie de la Falaise, Welsh-French former model and socialite
 Lucie Décosse, French judoka
 Lucie Dejardin, Belgian politician
 Lucie Delarue-Mardrus, French writer
 Lucie Edwards, Canadian diplomat
 Lucie Grange, French medium, newspaper editor
 Lucie Green, British astrophysicist
 Lucie Guay, Canadian sprint canoer
 Lucie Höflich, German actress
 Lucie Hradecká, Czech tennis player
Lucie Jones, Welsh singer
 Lucie Králová, Czech female model
 Lucie Krausová, Czech figure skater
 Lucie Lamoureux-Bruneau, Canadian politician
 Lucie Laurier, Canadian actress
 Lucie, Lady Duff-Gordon, English writer
 Lucie Leblanc, Canadian politician
 Lucie Mannheim, German actress
 Lucie Myslivečková, Czech ice dancer
 Lucie Oršulová, Czech ski mountaineer
 Lucie Paul-Margueritte, French writer, translator
 Lucie Paus Falck, Norwegian politician
 Lucie Pépin, Canadian politician
 Lucie Pohl, German-American actress and comedian
 Lucie Rie, British studio potter
 Lucie Salhany, American media executive
 Lucie Silvas, British singer-songwriter
 Lucie Šafářová, Czech tennis player
 Lucie Talmanová, Czech politician
 Lucie Vondráčková, Czech actress and singer
 Lucie Zhang, French actress

Middle name 
 Marie-Lucie Morin, Canadian public official and diplomat 
 Marie-Lucie Tarpent, French born Canadian linguist

Surname
 Edward Lucie-Smith, British writer
 Lawrence Lucie, American jazz guitarist

See also
 Luci
 Lucia (disambiguation)
 Lucy

French feminine given names
Czech feminine given names